"That's Just the Way It Is" is a song by English drummer Phil Collins, released as a single in July 1990 from his fourth solo studio album, ...But Seriously (1989). The track features David Crosby on background vocals. The song was only released as a single in Europe and Australasia, while "Do You Remember?" was instead released in the United States. The song reached number 26 in the UK Singles Chart.

The song, according to Collins, is an anti-war ballad that heavily deals with The Troubles of Northern Ireland. The song itself was positively received by most critics. The B-side to the song was "Broadway Chorus", the demo version of "Something Happened on the Way to Heaven".

Song information
The song is an anti-war ballad, about the conflict in Northern Ireland, The Troubles. Phil Collins said of the song:

David Crosby performs backing vocals on the song and duets with Collins several times. During live performances of the song, Collins would precede it with a monologue about what he thought were the "evils of war". The San Jose Mercury News criticized this, saying, "But instead of reinforcing his persona as rock's Good Old Bloke, it came across as a piece of show biz, as if he wasn't feeling it but simply reading it." The B-side of the single was "Broadway Chorus", a demo version of another hit single from the album, "Something Happened on the Way to Heaven".

Track listing
"That's Just the Way It Is" – 5:19
"Broadway Chorus" ("Something Happened on the Way to Heaven" Demo Version) – 4:17
"In The Air Tonight" (Extended Version) – 7:35

Reception
Don McLeese of The Chicago Sun-Times said that David Crosby was "used more effectively" on this song than any other song which had Crosby on the album. The Pittsburgh Post-Gazette however, said that the song was "so lyrically vague it lacked punch". Jon Pareles of The New York Times thought that the song "[echoed] Bruce Hornsby in tone and title". The San Jose Mercury News thought the song was "pretty". Lennox Samuels of The Dallas Morning News thought that the song "starts out as if it is going to be another "In the Air Tonight"..."before it moves into being an anti-war song". Meanwhile, The Atlanta Journal-Constitution thought that Crosby's vocals "lends challenging harmony".

Chart performance

Weekly charts

Year-end charts

Credits 
 Phil Collins – vocals
 David Crosby – vocals
 Brad Cole – keyboards
 Daryl Stuermer – guitars
 Leland Sklar – bass
 Chester Thompson – drums, percussion

References

1990 singles
Anti-war songs
Phil Collins songs
Songs about The Troubles (Northern Ireland)
Song recordings produced by Phil Collins
Song recordings produced by Hugh Padgham
Songs written by Phil Collins
1989 songs
Atlantic Records singles
Warner Music Group singles
Virgin Records singles